Rich Hill, also known as The Adventure or Griffith House, is a historic home located at Sassafras, Kent County, Maryland, United States. It is a 5-bay, -story brick building with a two-story brick kitchen wing, built about 1753.

Rich Hill was listed on the National Register of Historic Places in 1972.

References

External links
, including photo from 1970, at Maryland Historical Trust

Houses in Kent County, Maryland
Houses on the National Register of Historic Places in Maryland
Houses completed in 1753
National Register of Historic Places in Kent County, Maryland